In information geometry, a divergence is a kind of statistical distance: a binary function which establishes the separation from one probability distribution to another on a statistical manifold.

The simplest divergence is squared Euclidean distance (SED), and divergences can be viewed as generalizations of SED. The other most important divergence is relative entropy (Kullback–Leibler divergence, KL divergence), which is central to information theory. There are numerous other specific divergences and classes of divergences, notably f-divergences and Bregman divergences (see ).

Definition 
  for all  (non-negativity),
  if and only if  (positivity),
In applications to statistics, the manifold  is typically the space of parameters of a parametric family of probability distributions.

Condition 3 means that  defines an inner product on the tangent space  for every .

It is the Riemannian metric at point  expressed in coordinates .

Dimensional analysis of condition 3 shows that divergence has the dimension of squared distance.

The dual divergence  is defined as
 

Given any divergence , its symmetrized version is obtained by averaging it with its dual divergence:

Difference from other similar concepts 
Unlike metrics, divergences are not required to be symmetric, and the asymmetry is important in applications. Accordingly, one often refers asymmetrically to the divergence "of q from p" or "from p to q", rather than "between p and q". Secondly, divergences generalize squared distance, not linear distance, and thus do not satisfy the triangle inequality, but some divergences (such as the Bregman divergence) do satisfy generalizations of the Pythagorean theorem.

In general statistics and probability, "divergence" generally refers to any kind of function , where  are probability distributions or other objects under consideration, such that conditions 1, 2 are satisfied. Condition 3 is required for "divergence" as used in information geometry.

As an example, the total variation distance, a commonly used statistical divergence, does not satisfy condition 3.

Notation 
Notation for divergences varies significantly between fields, though there are some conventions.

Often a different separator between parameters is used, particularly to emphasize the asymmetry. In information theory, a double bar is commonly used: ; this is similar to, but distinct from, the notation for conditional probability, and emphasizes interpreting the divergence as a relative measurement, as in relative entropy; this notation is common for the KL divergence.

The notation for parameters varies as well.

Geometrical properties 

Many properties of divergences can be derived if we restrict S to be a statistical manifold, meaning that it can be  parametrized with a finite-dimensional coordinate system θ, so that for a distribution  we can write .

For a pair of points  with coordinates θp and θq, denote the partial derivatives of D(p, q) as
 
Now we restrict these functions to a diagonal , and denote 
 

 
where matrix g(D) is positive semi-definite and defines a unique Riemannian metric on the manifold S.

Divergence D(·, ·) also defines a unique torsion-free affine connection ∇(D) with coefficients
 
and the dual to this connection ∇* is generated by the dual divergence D*.

Thus, a divergence D(·, ·) generates on a statistical manifold a unique dualistic structure (g(D), ∇(D), ∇(D*)). The converse is also true: every torsion-free dualistic structure on a statistical manifold is induced from some globally defined divergence function (which however need not be unique).

Examples 
The two most important divergences are the relative entropy (Kullback–Leibler divergence, KL divergence), which is central to information theory and statistics, and the squared Euclidean distance (SED). Minimizing these two divergences is the main way that linear inverse problem are solved, via the principle of maximum entropy and least squares, notably in logistic regression and linear regression.

The two most important classes of divergences are the f-divergences and Bregman divergences; however, other types of divergence functions are also encountered in the literature. The only divergence that is both an f-divergence and a Bregman divergence is the Kullback–Leibler divergence; the squared Euclidean divergence is a Bregman divergence (corresponding to the function ), but not an f-divergence.

f-divergences 

Bregman divergences 

Bregman divergences correspond to convex functions on convex sets.

The dual divergence to a Bregman divergence is the divergence generated by the convex conjugate  of the Bregman generator of the original divergence.

History 
The use of the term "divergence" – both what functions it refers to, and what various statistical distances are called – has varied significantly over time, but by c. 2000 had settled on the current usage within information geometry, notably in the textbook .

The term "divergence" for a statistical distance was used informally in various contexts from c. 1910 to c. 1940.

 actually used "divergence" to refer to the symmetrized divergence (this function had already been defined and used by Harold Jeffreys in 1948), referring to the asymmetric function as "the mean information for discrimination ... per observation", while  referred to the asymmetric function as the "directed divergence".  referred generally to such a function as a "coefficient of divergence", and showed that many existing functions could be expressed as f-divergences, referring to Jeffreys' function as "Jeffreys' measure of divergence" (today "Jeffreys divergence"), and Kullback–Leibler's asymmetric function (in each direction) as "Kullback's and Leibler's measures of discriminatory information" (today "Kullback–Leibler divergence").

The term "divergence" is in contrast to a distance (metric), since the symmetrized divergence does not satisfy the triangle inequality. For example, the term "Bregman distance" is still found, but "Bregman divergence" is now preferred.

See also 
 Statistical distance

Notes

References

Bibliography

  
 
 
 
 
 
 
 
 
 
 
 
 
 . Republished by Dover Publications in 1968; reprinted in 1978: 
 

Statistical distance
F-divergences